Gurgaon railway station (Station code: GGN) is a small railway station in Gurgaon district, Haryana. The station consists of 3 platforms which are well sheltered having facilities including water, sanitation, Wifi etc. The station serves Gurgaon city and is a part of Delhi-Jaipur railway line. Gurgaon station is connected to important cities in India like New Delhi, Mumbai, Jaipur, Gandhinagar, Ahmedabad, Kanpur, Chandigarh, Patna, Howrah and Jammu. 

It is also connected to cities like Vadodara, Surat, Varanasi, Gorakhpur, Ayodhya, Ajmer, Udaipur, Jodhpur, Jaisalmer, Bikaner, Haridwar, Gaya etc.

History

Major trains 
Some of the important trains that run from Gurgaon are:

 Ala Hazrat Express (via Bhildi)
 Jaipur–Delhi Sarai Rohilla AC Double Decker Express
 Delhi Sarai Rohilla–Bandra Terminus Garib Rath Express
 Ajmer–Delhi Sarai Rohilla Jan Shatabdi Express
 Ahmedabad–Delhi Sarai Rohilla Special Fare AC Superfast Special
 Swarna Jayanti Rajdhani Express 
 Chetak Express
 Delhi Sarai Rohilla–Jaipur Special Fare Special
 Howrah–Jaisalmer Superfast Express
 Pooja Superfast Express
 Mandore Express
 Malani Express
 Corbett Park Link Express
 Ranikhet Express
 Uttaranchal Express
 Yoga Express
 Bhagat Ki Kothi–Delhi Sarai Rohilla Express
 Bhagat Ki Kothi–Kamakhya Express
 Udaipur City–New Jalpaiguri Weekly Express
 Ahmedabad–Varanasi Weekly Express

See also 

 Yellow Line (Delhi Metro)
 Rapid Metro Gurgaon

References

Railway stations in Gurgaon district
Delhi railway division
Transport in Gurgaon
Buildings and structures in Gurgaon